The Blackwing Sweden Blackwing is a Swedish ultralight and light-sport aircraft designed and produced by Blackwing Sweden of Lund, introduced at the AERO Friedrichshafen show in 2015. The aircraft is supplied as a kit for amateur construction or complete and ready-to-fly.

Design and development
The Blackwing is the result of a research project commenced in the 1990s, culminating in wind tunnel tests and a 350-hour prototype flight test program.

The design features a cantilever low-wing, an enclosed cockpit with two-seats-in-side-by-side configuration under a bubble canopy, fixed or optionally retractable tricycle landing gear and a single engine in tractor configuration.

The aircraft is made from pre-preg carbon fibre built on a foam core. Standard engines available are the  Rotax 912ULS and 912iS, although engines up to  can be installed.

As of January 2017, the design does not appear on the Federal Aviation Administration's list of approved special light-sport aircraft.

Operational history
Reviewer Marino Boric described the design in a 2015 review as "a sleek speedster".

Variants

Blackwing 600 RG
Blackwing 600 FG
Blackwing Edge

Blackwing 600 FG
Model with  gross weight for the European microlight category, fixed landing

Specifications (Blackwing 600 RG)

References

External links

Blackwing
2010s Swedish ultralight aircraft
Light-sport aircraft
Single-engined tractor aircraft